Lagocheirus delestali is a species of longhorn beetles of the subfamily Lamiinae. It was described by Toledo and Esteban in 2008, and is known from Costa Rica.

References

Beetles described in 2008
Lagocheirus